Samarendra Kundu (5 October 1930 – ?) was an Indian politician and a former Union minister of state of foreign affairs in the Government of India. He was elected to the 4th Lok Sabha in 1967 from Balasore in Orissa. He was re-elected to the Lok Sabha in 1977 and 1989 from the same constituency. He was a member of the Janata Dal political party. He was imprisoned during The Emergency in 1975–77, under MISA.

Reference

External links 
http://ws.ori.nic.in/ola/mlaprofile/profilepage.asp

1930 births
Year of death missing
India MPs 1967–1970
India MPs 1977–1979
India MPs 1989–1991
Indians imprisoned during the Emergency (India)
People from Odisha
Lok Sabha members from Odisha
Janata Dal politicians
People from Balasore district
Communist Party of India politicians from Odisha
Janata Party politicians